Geum japonicum, known as Asian herb bennet, is a yellow-flowering perennial plant native to North America and East Asia, especially Japan.  It may be synonymous with Geum macrophyllum, the North American flower.  As a traditional herbal remedy it is known as an astringent and used in poultices. However, in recent years, the Thunberg variant has received attention for other possible medical uses.

With regard to muscular recovery, an extract has been found to help muscles recover following "severe injury", to reduce myocardial infarct size by 35–45% when administered following a heart attack, and to inhibit apoptosis. It also has possible anti-viral properties, including action against HIV  and HSV. Action against tumors has also been noted.

References

External links
 photos of G. japonicum in Japan
 more photos in Japan
 free patent on G. japonicum Thunb extract

japonicum